Blommersia grandisonae is a species of frog in the family Mantellidae first described by Jean Marius René Guibé in 1974. It is endemic to Madagascar.

Its natural habitats are subtropical or tropical moist lowland forests, rivers, intermittent freshwater marshes, and plantations.

It is threatened by habitat loss.

See also
Amphibians of Madagascar

References

Sources
 IUCN SSC Amphibian Specialist Group (2016). "Blommersia grandisonae". IUCN Red List of Threatened Species: e.T57485A84171980. Retrieved 4 April 2020.

Mantellidae
Endemic frogs of Madagascar
Taxa named by Jean Marius René Guibé
Taxonomy articles created by Polbot
Amphibians described in 1974